Franck Montanella (born 26 March 1982) is a French rugby union footballer. He played for FC Auch in the 2006-07 Pro Rugby D2, which Auch won. His usual position is as a prop. He was also included in France's mid-year Test squad for 2007 in the two-game series against the All Blacks in New Zealand. He then played for Aix-en-Provence until the 2012 season when he moved to the newly promoted London Welsh. After his release from London Welsh, Montanella signed for Newcastle Falcons on a two-year contract to stay in the Aviva Premiership.

External links
 lequipe profile

1982 births
French rugby union players
Living people
Rugby union props
France international rugby union players
RC Narbonne players
Stade Français players
Provence Rugby players
CS Bourgoin-Jallieu players
London Welsh RFC players
Newcastle Falcons players
Biarritz Olympique players